Heterogena is a monotypic moth genus in the family Geometridae. Its only species, Heterogena exitela, is found in Australia. The genus and species were described by Turner in 1947.

References

Geometridae